Buôn Trấp is a town and capital of Krông Ana District, Đắk Lắk Province, Vietnam. The urban municipality contains 15 villages and hamlets. This town was established on 6 February, 1984.

References

Communes of Đắk Lắk province
Populated places in Đắk Lắk province
District capitals in Vietnam
Townships in Vietnam